Whitechurch may refer to:

Places
 Bila Tserkva, Ukraine
 Whitechurch, County Cork, Ireland
 Whitechurch, County Dublin, Ireland
 Whitechurch, County Kildare, Ireland
 Whitechurch, County Down, a townland in the civil parish of Ballywalter, Northern Ireland
 Whitechurch, Ontario, Canada

People
 Victor Whitechurch, an English clergyman and author

See also
 
 White Church (disambiguation)
 Whitchurch (disambiguation)